DeAndra' Cobb (born May 18, 1981) is a former professional American and Canadian football running back. He last played for the Montreal Alouettes of the Canadian Football League. He was drafted by the Atlanta Falcons in the sixth round of the 2005 NFL Draft. He played college football for the Michigan State Spartans.

Cobb was also a member of the Jacksonville Jaguars and the Hamilton Tiger-Cats.

Early years
Cobb attended Clark High School in Las Vegas, Nevada and was a letterman in football and track. In track, he finished second in the 100 meters at the 1999 Nevada Class 4A Championships, and ran a personal best of 10.4 seconds in the 100 meters. He graduated from Clark High School in 1999.

College career
He was regarded as one of the premier kickoff returners in college football, returning four kickoffs for touchdowns (one return shy of the Big Ten Conference record of five) for the Michigan State Spartans in 24 games played. He earned first-team All-America honors after setting a Michigan State single-season record with three kickoff returns for touchdowns as a junior, which also tied an NCAA Division I record shared with six others.

Professional career

National Football League
Cobb was drafted by the Atlanta Falcons in the 2005 NFL Draft in the sixth round. Before the 2006 NFL season the Falcons released Cobb. He was signed by the Jacksonville Jaguars on December 22, 2006, but never played a game for them and was subsequently released.

Canadian Football League

Hamilton Tiger-Cats
Cobb was signed by the Hamilton Tiger-Cats on May 29, 2009. He was released on June 25, 2009, before being re-signed to the practice roster. He made his professional debut on July 10, 2009, in the Ti-Cats' victory over the BC Lions and was named the CFL's offensive player of the week. In the game, he ran for 110 yards over 14 carries and made 5 receptions for 75 yards including a 48-yard touchdown catch in the fourth quarter that gave Hamilton it 31–28 win; its first of the season and ended the Ti-Cats' nine-game losing streak against the Lions.

He rushed for over one thousand yards in both seasons with the Ticats (1207 and 1173.)

On March 1, 2011, Cobb was released by the Tiger-Cats.

Montreal Alouettes
Cobb was signed by the Montreal Alouettes on March 18, 2011.

After sustaining an injury in training camp, he was released by the Alouettes on July 12.

Teaching 
DeAndra' Cobb now works as a Physical Education teacher at Freedom Classical Academy in North Las Vegas.

See also
 List of college football yearly rushing leaders

References

Further reading

External links
Atlanta Falcons bio
Hamilton Tiger-Cats bio
Slideshow on Cobb from Hamilton Spectator

1981 births
African-American players of Canadian football
American football running backs
American players of Canadian football
Atlanta Falcons players
Canadian football running backs
Hamilton Tiger-Cats players
Jacksonville Jaguars players
Living people
Michigan State Spartans football players
Montreal Alouettes players
Sportspeople from Las Vegas
21st-century African-American sportspeople
20th-century African-American people